Atacames is a beach town located on Ecuador's Northern Pacific coast. It is located in the province of Esmeraldas, approximately 30 kilometers south west from the capital of that province, which is also called Esmeraldas. In 2005 Atacames's population was 11,251 inhabitants. Atacames has one of the lowest rates of poverty in the province of Esmeraldas (68% in 2005).

During Francisco Pizarro's second conquest in 1526, he landed at Atacames. There he was unable to conquer or invade the land due to the resistance that he found in the local people who were at that time under the Incas.

In the centuries after Spanish conquest, some slave ships came from Africa. In 1553 a ship carrying slaves from Panama to Peru was stranded on Esmeralda, and the 25 slaves on board managed to escape from their captors. 
In the following years more escaped slaves, along with the descendants of the former slaves, developed some of the lands along the coast. Although there were also other people groups present in Atacames in the 16th century, today Afro-Ecuadoreans make up a large portion of the population in Atacames.

Tourism is Atacames's primary industry. For its population, Atacames has the highest level of hotels in the whole province of Esmeraldas.  It is also easily accessible by bus from Santo Domingo, Quito, and Esmeraldas.

Surfing in Atacames & Ecuador
People travel from all over the world to enjoy Surfing in Ecuador. Playas beach also offers a wonderful climate all year round for Surfing. It is important to note that Sharks may be a hazard at this break. Salinas, Ecuador, was the site of the ISA World Junior Surfing Games Ecuador in 2009.

Atacames Nightlife
Atacames has a busy night life, primarily because weather during the day is hot and humid. Atacames provides services for tourists all year round, but the high season are weekends, Easter, Carnival, Christmas, and some weeks in the summer. Atacames is full of discotheques, and dance clubs that play the most recent hits from different styles of music such as salsa, merengue, and reggaeton. Atacames is also well known for its "caipirinhas", a Brazilian drink made from sugar cane alcohol, fresh lime juice and much ice. Along most of the beach there are bartenders situated in kiosks along the colorful beach shore that make a variety of local fruit shakes and juices. There a covered (though outdoor) line of booths called "covachas" where locals sell a variety of products such as hand made jewelry and handcrafts. Dozens of local women also earn a living by braiding and putting beads in hair.

Eating in Atacames
The food served in Atacames is typical for much of the coastal regions of Ecuador. Meals will often consist of shrimp, crab, lobster, and fish. Several of the citizens in Atacames fish, and thus much of the food that is served is fresh. In Atacames you can typically find delicious ceviches, encocados and all sorts of seafood and, as is typical in most of Ecuador, rice is generally served with the meal. A wide variety of fruit juices are also served, though beer (particularly Pilsener), water, and carbonated beverages are also common. Vegetables, which are generally grown in the highlands of Ecuador, are often missing from the regular diet due to their higher price.

Transportation in Atacames
Although only a small town, Atacames has several taxi services. Only one of these actually involves vehicular transport as the rest of the taxi services rely on bikes that are either gas or manually powered.

References

External links

 Surfing forecast for Atacames, Ecuador
 exploringecuador.com Birdwathing
 Birdwatching Tours in Ecuador
 ecuadors.org Informacion on Atacames, Ecuador 
 map of Atacames and province of Esmeraldas 

Beaches of Ecuador
Populated places in Esmeraldas Province
Populated coastal places in Ecuador
Surfing locations in Ecuador
Tourist attractions in Esmeraldas Province